Mountebank may refer to:
 A charlatan who sells phony medicines from a platform
 Monte Bank, a card game
 The Mountebanks, a comic opera by Alfred Cellier and W. S. Gilbert